The 1995 Memphis Mad Dogs season was the first and only season in their franchise history. Memphis finished 4th in the South Division with a 9–9 record, but missed the playoffs.

Preseason

Regular season

Season Standings

Season schedule

Awards and honors

CFL All-Stars

CFL Southern All-Stars

References

Memphis Mad Dogs Season, 1995